Hakkari University is a university located in Hakkari, Turkey. It was established in 2008.

References

External links
Website

Universities and colleges in Turkey
2008 establishments in Turkey
State universities and colleges in Turkey
Educational institutions established in 2008
Hakkâri